Robert Morris is a bronze statue by Paul Wayland Bartlett commemorating American Revolution financier and statesman Robert Morris.
It is located at Independence Hall, on 4th Street and Walnut Street, Philadelphia.

It was dedicated on June 18, 1926, at the Second Bank of the United States on Chestnut Street, but was relocated in 1961.

The inscription reads:

(Sculpture, lower proper right edge:)
Paul W. Bartlett Sc. 
(Sculpture, rear right side:) 
J. Arthur Limerick Co.
Founders . Balto. 
(Base, front:) 

signed Founder's mark appears.

See also 
 List of public art in Philadelphia

References

External links 
http://www.nps.gov/inde/planyourvisit/plaques-and-statues-in-the-park.htm
http://dcmemorials.com/index_indiv0006540.htm
http://www.philadelphiafaithandfreedom.com/robertmorrisstatue
https://www.flickr.com/photos/wallyg/2550222618/

Outdoor sculptures in Philadelphia
1923 sculptures
Bronze sculptures in Pennsylvania
Independence National Historical Park
Statues in Pennsylvania
Sculptures of men in Pennsylvania
1920s establishments in Pennsylvania
Monuments and memorials in Pennsylvania
Relocated buildings and structures in Pennsylvania
Statues of U.S. Founding Fathers